Richard or Dick Hyde may refer to:

Politicians
Richard Hyde (MP for Worcestershire), Member of Parliament (MP) for Worcestershire
Richard Hyde (MP for Dorchester) (fl.1406)

Others
Dick Hyde (baseball) (born 1928), American former relief pitcher
Dick Hyde (musician), American trombone and tuba player

See also
John Richard Hyde (1912–2003), Canadian soldier, provincial politician and judge